Saint-Lô Agglo is the communauté d'agglomération, an intercommunal structure, centred on the town of Saint-Lô. It is located in the Manche department, in the Normandy region, northwestern France. Created in 2017, its seat is in Saint-Lô. Its area is 819.9 km2. Its population was 76,116 in 2019, of which 19,050 in Saint-Lô proper.

Composition
The communauté d'agglomération consists of the following 61 communes:

Agneaux
Airel
Amigny
La Barre-de-Semilly
Baudre
Beaucoudray
Bérigny
Beuvrigny
Biéville
Bourgvallées
Canisy
Carantilly
Cavigny
Cerisy-la-Forêt
Condé-sur-Vire
Couvains
Dangy
Le Dézert
Domjean
Fourneaux
Gouvets
Graignes-Mesnil-Angot
Lamberville
Le Lorey
La Luzerne
Le Perron
Marigny-le-Lozon
La Meauffe
Le Mesnil-Amey
Le Mesnil-Eury
Le Mesnil-Rouxelin
Le Mesnil-Véneron
Montrabot
Montreuil-sur-Lozon
Moon-sur-Elle
Moyon Villages
Pont-Hébert
Quibou
Rampan
Remilly Les Marais
Saint-Amand-Villages
Saint-André-de-l'Épine
Saint-Clair-sur-l'Elle
Sainte-Suzanne-sur-Vire
Saint-Fromond
Saint-Georges-d'Elle
Saint-Georges-Montcocq
Saint-Germain-d'Elle
Saint-Gilles
Saint-Jean-de-Daye
Saint-Jean-d'Elle
Saint-Jean-de-Savigny
Saint-Lô
Saint-Louet-sur-Vire
Saint-Martin-de-Bonfossé
Saint-Pierre-de-Semilly
Saint-Vigor-des-Monts
Tessy-Bocage
Thèreval
Torigny-les-Villes
Villiers-Fossard

References

Saint-Lo
Saint-Lo